Psalm 147 is the 147th psalm of the Book of Psalms, beginning in English in the King James Version, "Praise ye the : for it is good to sing praises". In the slightly different numbering system used in the Greek Septuagint version of the Bible, and in the Latin  Vulgate/Vulgata Clementina, this psalm is divided into Psalm 146 and Psalm 147. In Latin, Psalm 146 is known as "Laudate Dominum quoniam bonum psalmus", and Psalm 147 as "Lauda Jerusalem Dominum".

Both are considered psalms of praise and feature among the five final praise psalms in the psalter. They are used as regular parts of Jewish, Catholic, Anglican, Lutheran, and other Protestant liturgies and have often been set to music.

Alternate numbering system
The Greek Septuagint and Latin Vulgate versions of the Bible follow the numbering system for the psalms used by the Hebrew Bible and King James Version through Psalm 8, but combine and divide several psalms after that. Psalm 147 is the last to be divided into two parts, renumbered as Psalm 146 and Psalm 147. Psalm 146 in the Septuagint and Vulgate is composed of verses 1–11 of the present Psalm 147, while Psalm 147 in the Septuagint and Vulgate is composed of verses 12–20 of the present Psalm 147.

Background and themes
Psalm 147 is one of the last five psalms in the Book of Psalms and, like the others in this group, begins and ends in Hebrew with the word "Hallelujah" ("Praise God"). Thus it is classified as a psalm of praise. Charles Spurgeon notes that verse 1 draws a connection between praise and song, since "[s]inging the divine praises is the best possible use of speech". Beginning in verse 2, the psalmist presents a series of reasons for praising God, including his continual attention to the city of Jerusalem, to brokenhearted and injured individuals, to the cosmos, and to nature. C S Rodd divides the psalm into three sections, "each of which is in the form of a complete hymn of praise", namely verses 1-6, 7-11 and 12-20.

In the Septuagint, Psalms 145 to 148 are given the title "of Haggai and Zechariah".

Text

Hebrew Bible version
The following is the Hebrew text of Psalm 147:

King James Version
 Praise ye the : for it is good to sing praises unto our God; for it is pleasant; and praise is comely. 
 The  doth build up Jerusalem: he gathereth together the outcasts of Israel. 
 He healeth the broken in heart, and bindeth up their wounds. 
 He telleth the number of the stars; he calleth them all by their names. 
 Great is our Lord, and of great power: his understanding is infinite. 
 The  lifteth up the meek: he casteth the wicked down to the ground. 
 Who covereth the heaven with clouds, who prepareth rain for the earth, who maketh grass to grow upon the mountains. 
 He giveth to the beast his food, and to the young ravens which cry. 
 He delighteth not in the strength of the horse: he taketh not pleasure in the legs of a man. 
 The  taketh pleasure in them that fear him, in those that hope in his mercy. 
 For he hath strengthened the bars of thy gates; he hath blessed thy children within thee. 
 He maketh peace in thy borders, and filleth thee with the finest of the wheat. 
 He sendeth forth his commandment upon earth: his word runneth very swiftly. 
 He giveth snow like wool: he scattereth the hoarfrost like ashes. 
 He casteth forth his ice like morsels: who can stand before his cold? 
 He sendeth out his word, and melteth them: he causeth his wind to blow, and the waters flow. 
 He sheweth his word unto Jacob, his statutes and his judgments unto Israel. 
 He hath not dealt so with any nation: and as for his judgments, they have not known them.

Verse 2
The Lord builds up Jerusalem;He gathers together the outcasts of Israel.Rabbi Yehudah Aryeh Leib Alter of Ger (Sefat Emet) notes that in the Hebrew original, verse 2 is written in the present tense: "The Lord builds Jerusalem". He teaches that since the destruction of the Holy Temple, each generation actively contributes toward its rebuilding in a cumulative way through its merits.

Rambam draws from verse 2 a timeline for the events following the coming of the Mashiach (Jewish Messiah). First the Mashiach will arrive, then the Holy Temple will be built ("The Lord builds Jerusalem"), and then the ingathering of the exiles will take place ("He gathers together the outcasts of Israel"). The Zohar adds that the Resurrection of the Dead will take place forty years after the return of the exiles.

Uses
Judaism
Psalm 147 is recited in its entirety in Pesukei Dezimra in the daily morning prayer service. It is recited as the Psalm of the Day on Simchat Torah in the Siddur Avodas Yisroel.

Catholicism
Since the Middle Ages, this psalm was recited or sung at the office of Vespers on Saturday, according to the Rule of St. Benedict of 530AD.

In the Liturgy of the Hours today, the first part (verses 1–11), numbered as Psalm 146 in the Septuagint and Vulgate, is recited or sung at Lauds on Thursday of the fourth week, and the second part (verses 12–20), numbered as Psalm 147 in the Septuagint and Vulgate, is recited or sung on Friday of the second and fourth week of the four-week cycle of the psalter. In the liturgy of the Mass, the first part (Psalm 146) is sung or read on the fifth Sunday in Ordinary Time of Year B of the three-year Sundays cycle and on the first Saturday in Advent in the two-year weekday cycle, and the second part (Psalm 147) is used on the feast of the Most Holy Body and Blood of Christ in year A of the Sundays cycle, and on several weekdays.

 Musical settings 
In Catholicism, Lauda Jerusalem, Psalm 147 in the Vulgate numbering, was one of the psalms included in vespers services, and thus set to music often. Settings of German translations of Psalm 147 (Hebrew Bible numbering) were published from the second half of the 16th century.

Lauda Jerusalem Dominum
In 1610, Monteverdi published his Vespro della Beata Vergine, setting five Latin psalms to music. The last of these, Lauda Jerusalem, is arranged for two choirs of three voices each, soprano, alto and bass, while the tenors sing the cantus firmus. Marc-Antoine Charpentier set 3  "Lauda Jerusalem Dominum", H.158  (1670), H.191 (1684) and H.210 (1690). Michel Richard Delalande set Lauda Jerusalem Dominum for the celebration of daily Mass for King Louis XIV at Versailles. Henry Desmarest, a contemporary of Delalande, wrote a grand motet on this psalm. Jan Dismas Zelenka composed three settings with orchestra, ZWV 102–104, though ZWV 103 is lost. Antonio Vivaldi composed a setting of Lauda Jerusalem as his RV 609, scored for two choirs, each with a solo soprano, four vocal parts and strings.

German translations
In 1568 Antonio Scandello published the first volume of his , which contained, as fifth item, a four-part setting of "Lobet den Herren, denn er ist sehr freundlich", a German version of Psalm 147. A rhymed translation of the Psalm, "Zu Lob und Ehr mit Freuden singt" (To praise and honour sing with joy), was published in the Becker Psalter (1602), to be sung to the tune of Es woll uns Gott genädig sein (Zahn No. 7247), a text version for which Heinrich Schütz, quarter of a century later, composed an entirely new four-part setting (SWV 252, Zahn No. 7260).

Scandello's setting was reprinted in hymnals such as Johann Hermann Schein's 1627 , and Gottfried Vopelius's 1682 Neu Leipziger Gesangbuch, where the German text is attributed to Nikolaus Selnecker.Vopelius, Gottfried (1682) Neu Leipziger Gesangbuch, pp. 596–599. Johann Sebastian Bach based one of his four-part chorales, "Lobet den Herren, denn er ist sehr freundlich", BWV 374, on a hymn tune derived from Scandello's setting. The lyrics of the opening chorus of Bach's 1723 cantata Preise, Jerusalem, den Herrn, BWV 119 ("Praise the Lord, Jerusalem"), for the inauguration of a new town council in Leipzig, are a dictum taken from a prose translation of verses 12–14 of Psalm 147.

After Scandello's setting, and the hymn tune derived from it in the early 18th century (Zahn No. 975), five more melodies for the "Lobet den Herren, denn er ist sehr freundlich" translation of Psalm 147 were composed and published from the 1730s to the 1830s (Zahn Nos. 976–980). Around 1856, Anton Bruckner set verses 1 to 11 of the Psalm (i.e. the entire Psalm 146 in the Vulgate numbering) as Alleluja! Lobet den Herrn; denn lobsingen ist gut'', WAB 37, for soloists, double mixed choir, and orchestra.

References

Sources

Further reading

External links 

 
 
 Text of Psalm 147 according to the 1928 Psalter
 Psalms Chapter 147 text in Hebrew and English, mechon-mamre.org
 Psalm 147 – Praising God of Care and Creation text and detailed commentary, enduringword.com
 Hallelujah! / How good to sing praise to our God; how pleasant to give fitting praise. Text and footnotes, usccb.org United States Conference of Catholic Bishops
 Psalm 147:1 introduction and text, biblestudytools.com
 Psalm 147 / Great is our Lord and mighty in power. Church of England
 Psalm 147 at biblegateway.com
Hymnary.org, Hymns for Psalm 147
 Recording of a modern Israeli tune to verses 12-13 (set to music by Avihu Medina)

Pesukei dezimra
Shacharit
Siddur of Orthodox Judaism
147